The Bank OZK Arena, formerly known as Summit Arena and Bank of the Ozarks Arena, is a 6,300-seat multi-purpose arena in Hot Springs, Arkansas, USA. It hosts local sporting events, concerts, and assorted other engagements such as the Miss Arkansas Pageant. It was opened in 2003 with a concert by Tony Bennett.  The arena can seat 6,050 for sporting events and circuses. It has hosted the Arkansas Activities Association's High School Basketball Championships since 2012 and the Great American Conference's Women's Volleyball Championship since 2013.  It has been the site of the Forrest L. Wood national bass fishing championship three times and will host the event again in 2015.

The complex is also home to a permanent art collection.

Prior to the 2014 acquisition of Summit Bank of Arkadelphia, Arkansas by Bank of the Ozarks, Summit Bank was the arena's naming sponsor.

References

External links
Bank OZK Arena
Hot Springs Convention Center
Map: 

Convention centers in Arkansas
Sports venues in Arkansas
Indoor arenas in Arkansas
Buildings and structures in Hot Springs, Arkansas
Tourist attractions in Garland County, Arkansas
2003 establishments in Arkansas
Sports venues completed in 2003
Basketball venues in Arkansas
Volleyball venues in the United States